Shooting Star was an extreme clipper built in 1851 near Boston, in Medford, Massachusetts. She was the first "real clipper" to be built in Medford, and sailed in the San Francisco, China, and Far East trades. According to Howe and Matthews, she was known as "one of the fastest of the small clippers".

Construction
The frames were made of white oak, with planking of Southern pine. The ship was coppered and copper fastened.

Voyages
Shooting Star was partially dismasted on its maiden voyage was from Boston to San Francisco, and had to put in at Rio for repairs, completing its voyage in 124 days. The second voyage from Boston to San Francisco was faster, with a time of 105 days.

Voyages in 1853 and 1855 from New York to San Francisco were completed in 123 and 116 days.

Shooting Star's most notable run was a homeward passage from Whampoa, China, in which she made a passage from Macao to Boston in 86 days.

After 1856, Shooting Star sailed in the Asia and China trade.

Shooting Star made a 264-day circumnavigation.

Namesakes 
 A second Shooting Star was built by Reed, Wade, and Co. in 1859. It was a 947-ton medium clipper. This ship was captured and burned by Chickamauga, a Confederate privateer, on Oct. 31, 1864, when it was on a voyage from New York to Panama.
 An extreme clipper built in 1851, the Ino, was renamed Shooting Star after its sale in 1867. It was later re-rigged as a bark.
 A 1518-ton Class A1 ship named Shooting Star was built in Quebec in 1853.

References

External links
 Portrait of the clipper Shooting Star, Royal Museums Greenwich Art Prints

California clippers
Individual sailing vessels
Ships built in Medford, Massachusetts
Age of Sail merchant ships of the United States
Maritime incidents in 1867
1851 ships